Désirée was a  of the French Navy, launched at Dunkirk in 1794. The British Royal Navy captured her in 1800 and took her into service under her existing name. she was laid up in 1815, converted to a slop ship in 1823, and sold in 1832.

Capture
, under Patrick Campbell, captured Désirée on 8 July 1800 in the Raid on Dunkirk. Many British vessels shared in the proceeds of the capture.

British career

On 7 May 1813, she was under the command of Captain Arthur Farquarh when she captured the American schooner Decatur.

On 17 July 1813 she captured the French privateer Esperance.

Fate
Desiree was laid up at Sheerness in August 1815. Between January and November 1823 she was fitted as a slop ship. She was sold for £2,020 on 22 August 1832 to Joseph Christie at Rotherhithe.

Notes, citations and references

Notes

Citations

References

 

Age of Sail frigates of France
Romaine-class frigates
1796 ships
Captured ships
Frigates of the Royal Navy